Vayrac station (French: Gare de Vayrac) is a French closed train station on the ligne de Souillac à Viescamp-sous-Jallès, close to town in the Commune of Vayrac, in the departement of Lot, in the region of Occitanie.

It was in service from 1891, for the Compagnie du chemin de fer de Paris à Orléans (PO).

It took passengers from the Société nationale des chemins de fer français (SNCF), served until 2017 by trains of the TER Occitanie network.

Railway  

History 

The Gare de Vayrac was opened on 11 May 1891 by the Compagnie du chemin de fer de Paris à Orléans (PO), used as a stop between the Saint-Denis-près-Martel and Viescamp-sous-Jallès.

The station has a passenger building, with a central body with three openings, with a floor under a roof with two sides, framed by two small wings to an opening on the ground floor under a roof with two sides.

In 1896, the Compagnie du PO indicated that receipts for the station for the year totalled 134,184 francs.

Having once been used as a stop by the SNCF, the passenger building is now closed.

Since July 2017, no trains have stopped at the station.

Railway history

The former passenger buildings are still present at the site.

Notes and references

See also

Linked articles 
 List of SNCF stations in Occitanie
 Ligne de Souillac à Viescamp-sous-Jallès

Defunct railway stations in Lot (department)
Railway stations in France opened in 1891